Julian Dean (born 28 January 1975) is a former professional road racing cyclist from New Zealand who competed as a professional between 1999 and 2013. He last rode for UCI World Tour team , where he now works as an assistant sporting director and mentor. His main achievements include winning the 2007 and 2008 New Zealand National Road Race Championships, finishing 9th in the 2005 World Road Championships in Madrid, and 10th place in the 2002 World Road Championships in Zolder. At the peak of his career he was considered the best lead out rider in the world, and was highly regarded by his teammate and friend Thor Hushovd.

Early life 
Born in Waihi, New Zealand, Dean is the son of Waimata dairy farmers Peter and Valerie Dean. Locally known as the "Grasshopper", started cycling when he was just a child, beginning at the local BMX club in, where he had success with two 3rd-place finishes in the New Zealand Championships. Dean tried his hand at many sports before moving onto triathlon, which he enjoyed. From triathlon, Dean fell in love with cycling, where he represented New Zealand in road and track disciplines. In 1997, Dean got his chance to race in the US with the Shaklee team and the Mercury cycling team in 1998.

Career

US Postal 
In 1999, Dean signed to the now-defunct US Postal Service Pro Cycling Team, whom he rode for until 2001, gaining experience from racing in Europe. He managed his first European victories with 2 stage wins in the tour of Britain. After having ridden in a team based around Lance Armstrong Dean went looking for new opportunities.

He got them by joining  in 2002. However, his joy was short-lived when Dean broke his leg in March 2002 and was out for three months. He took a stage win in the short stage race Tour de Wallonie taking the leaders jersey & holding on to win the overall race beating some of the world's best riders to the victory including a great tussle with Italy's star rider Michele Bartoli.

Credit Agricole 
He finished 8th behind stage winner Tom Boonen in Stage 6 of the Tour de France. He missed the 2005 edition of the Tour due to an injury incurred in the 2005 Giro d'Italia. He later returned for the 2006 edition.

The 2007 cycling season started well with Dean winning the New Zealand Road Racing Champion title. This win entitled Dean to represent and wear the black and white New Zealand national cycling jersey whilst racing in all international road-racing events throughout the 2007 season. He continued to ride for the French-based team Crédit Agricole.

During the 2007 Tour de France, Dean was known for his role of lead-out for Thor Hushovd. Hushovd later said in interviews that Dean was "the best lead-out man in the world."
Dean's last public appearance wearing the Crédit Agricole jersey was the 2007 Mt Maunganui criterium race, held on 27 December 2007. He won the elite category.

Slipstream-Chipotle 
From 2008 to 2011, Dean rode for Jonathan Vaughters' team . He once again started the year by winning the New Zealand national Road Racing Championship, held in January. He recorded six top-ten finishes in the 2008 Tour de France, with a best performance of fourth in stage 14. His overall classification was 110th, and 9th in the points competition.

In 2009, during the 13th stage of the Tour de France from Vittel to Colmar he, along with Óscar Freire of  got shot by an air rifle. He got shot in the thumb but was able to continue with a largely swollen hand where he eventually finished 112th on the stage. In completing the Tour de France, Dean became the only rider to start and finish all three grand tours during the 2009 season.

During the finish of stage 11 from Sisteron to Bourg les Valence in the Tour de France Dean was involved in a highly publicised incident with Mark Renshaw, who repeatedly headbutted Julian Dean, who he believed had come across into his lead out. Subsequently, Renshaw was disqualified from the Tour de France.

GreenEDGE 
In October 2011 Dean confirmed his move to the new Australian professional cycling team, . Dean believed "It [is] a hugely exciting development for cycling, especially in Australia and New Zealand" and that "With the quality of the team named, [he is] confident we'll get World Tour status straight away" which was subsequently achieved. Australian riders already signed to GreenEDGE include 2011 Milan – San Remo winner, Matthew Goss, Australian National Road Race Champion, Jack Bobridge, Australian National Time Trial Champion and 2011 Tour Down Under winner, Cameron Meyer, four time Tour de France runner up, Stuart O'Grady and three-time winner of the points classification in the Tour de France, Robbie McEwen. Julian had a training injury at the first  camp. In December 2012 Dean confirmed his retirement from racing, his final race will be the New Zealand National Road Race Championships on 13 January. He will continue to work with GreenEdge Cycling as an assistant sporting director and mentor.

Grand Tour results

Tour de France 

 2004 : 127th
 2006 : 127th
 2007 : 107th
 2008 : 110th
 2009 : 121st
 2010 : 157th
 2011 : 145th

Giro d'Italia 
 2005 : Abandoned, Stage 6
 2007 : 93rd
 2008 : Did not start, Stage 19
 2009 : 136th
 2010 : Did not start, Stage 19

Vuelta a España 
 2005 : Abandoned, Stage 15
 2009 : 132nd
 2010 : Did not start, Stage 13

Personal life 
Dean is married with two children. During his time in New Zealand, Dean, is based in Rotorua, New Zealand where he hopes to eventually be based permanently. In 2010 Dean competed in the Singlespeed Mountain Biking World Championships.

Palmares 

1993
 3rd  World U19 Team Pursuit Championship

1994
 3rd  Team Pursuit, Victoria, Commonwealth Games

1995
 1st  Kilometer Champion
 Best All-Around Performance, New Zealand Track Championship

1996
 1st  Individual Pursuit champion
 1st  Points Race Champion
 1st Tour of Somerville
 1st stage Tour of Ohio
 1st Red Rose Rocket Criterium
 1st stage, Tour of Wellington

1997
 1st Visalia Criterium
 1st Santa Rosa Criterium

1998
 1st Outdoor Life Network GP
 1st Overall, US National Point Series
 1st Visalia Criterium
 1st stage, Tour LeFleur
 1st sprint competition Redlands Classic

1999
 1st  Overall Tour of Wellington
1st Stage 11
 Tour of Britain
1st Stages 2 & 7

2000
10th First Union USPRO Championships

2001
 1st First Union Classic
 1st Stage 4 Vuelta a Castilla y León

2002
10th World Road Race Championships
10th Paris–Tours

2003
 1st  Overall Tour de Wallonie
1st Stages 4 & 5
 1st Wachovia Classic
 1st Stage 2 Circuit Franco-Belge

2004
2nd Overall Tour of Britain
1st  Points classification

2005
 9th Road Race World Championships

2007
 1st  National Road Race Championships
 1st  National Criterium Championships

2008
 1st  National Road Race Championships
 1st Stage 1 TTT Giro d'Italia
3rd Overall Tour of Ireland

2010
 3rd National Road Race Championships

2011
 1st Stage 2 TTT Tour de France

2013
 3rd National Road Race Championships

References

External links 

Cyclingnews.com 2007 NZ Road Championships
 

1975 births
Living people
New Zealand male cyclists
Olympic cyclists of New Zealand
Commonwealth Games bronze medallists for New Zealand
Cyclists at the 1994 Commonwealth Games
Cyclists at the 1996 Summer Olympics
Cyclists at the 2000 Summer Olympics
Cyclists at the 2004 Summer Olympics
Cyclists at the 2008 Summer Olympics
People from Waihi
Commonwealth Games medallists in cycling
20th-century New Zealand people
21st-century New Zealand people
Sportspeople from Waikato
Medallists at the 1994 Commonwealth Games